John Allison (born 1950) is a New Zealand poet, musician, and former teacher in Rudolf Steiner (Waldorf) Education.

Allison was born in New Zealand and taught at the Christchurch Waldorf Steiner School for 24 years. He has lectured and written on themes related to poetic imagination and observation, anthroposophy, and Waldorf education., though he is no longer formally associated with anthroposophy.

References

Publications
Prose
Walking Out of Another World, Immortal Books, Murwillumbah 2010
A Teacher's Book: digging deeper, Immortal Books, Murwillumbah 2008
A Way of Seeing: Perception, Imagination, and Poetry, Lindisfarne Books, Great Barrington 2003.
Living in Light Loving the Dark, Initiative Circle of the Waldorf Pedagogical Section in New Zealand 2003
Where Children Are: beginning to understand Waldorf Education, Initiative Circle of the Waldorf Pedagogical Section in New Zealand 2001

Poetry
Near Distance, Cold Hub Press, Christchurch 2020
A Place To Return To, Cold Hub Press, Christchurch 2019
Balance, Five Islands Press, Melbourne 2006
Stone Moon Dark Water, Sudden Valley Press, Christchurch 1999
Both Roads Taken, Sudden Valley Press, Christchurch 1997
Dividing the Light, Hazard Press, Christchurch 1997

1950 births
Living people
Anthroposophists
New Zealand poets
New Zealand male writers
Australian male poets
Australian poets